The 1998–99 NCAA Division I men's ice hockey season began on October 3, 1998, and concluded with the 1999 NCAA Division I Men's Ice Hockey Tournament's championship game on April 3, 1999, at the Arrowhead Pond of Anaheim in Anaheim, California. This was the 52nd season in which an NCAA ice hockey championship was held and is the 105th year overall where an NCAA school fielded a team.

The 1998-99 season was the inaugural year for Metro Atlantic Athletic Conference's hockey division. Because only Canisius, Fairfield, and Iona were full members of the MAAC, five additional associate members were included to make the conference viable. All five teams had been part of ECAC lower classifications in the past (as had Canisius, Fairfield and Iona) and were promoted to Division I for the 1998-99 season.

Pre-season polls

The top 10 from USCHO.com/CBS College Sports

Regular season

Season tournaments

Standings

1999 NCAA Tournament

Note: * denotes overtime period(s)

Player stats

Scoring leaders
The following players led the league in points at the conclusion of the season.

  
GP = Games played; G = Goals; A = Assists; Pts = Points; PIM = Penalty minutes

Leading goaltenders
The following goaltenders led the league in goals against average at the end of the regular season while playing at least 33% of their team's total minutes.

GP = Games played; Min = Minutes played; W = Wins; L = Losses; OT = Overtime/shootout losses; GA = Goals against; SO = Shutouts; SV% = Save percentage; GAA = Goals against average

Awards

NCAA

CCHA

ECAC

Hockey East

MAAC

WCHA

See also
 1998–99 NCAA Division II men's ice hockey season
 1998–99 NCAA Division III men's ice hockey season

References

External links
USCHO.com 
College Hockey Historical Archives

 
NCAA